Moulsecoomb railway station serves Moulsecoomb and Hollingdean, both suburbs of Brighton in East Sussex, England.

The station was opened in May 1980 — the first completely new station on the then Southern Region since the Beeching Axe. It is located adjacent to the Moulsecoomb campus of the University of Brighton.

The station has separate entrances to each platform; these are connected by a footbridge which also serves as a public right of way.  The entrance to Platform 1 (the westbound platform) is via a set of steps from Queensdown School Road, a steeply sloping cul-de-sac off the main Lewes Road.  Platform 2 is reached from a path leading from the end of Crespin Way, another cul-de-sac at the eastern edge of the Hollingdean estate.

Services 

All services at Moulsecoomb are operated by Southern using  and  EMUs.

The typical off-peak service in trains per hour is:
 3 tph to 
 2 tph to 
 1 tph to  via 

See also 
 Transport in Brighton

References

External links 

Railway stations in Brighton and Hove
Railway stations opened by British Rail
Railway stations in Great Britain opened in 1980
Railway stations served by Govia Thameslink Railway
DfT Category E stations